Rosa Tarlovsky de Roisinblit (born 15 August 1919) is an Argentine human rights activist who is the current vice president and founding member of the Grandmothers of the Plaza de Mayo Association. Tarlovsky was born in a rural area of the province of Santa Fe as the daughter of a farmer and rancher who suffered the consequences of the Great Depression. At the end of primary education, she moved to Rosario to study midwifery. She then worked at the Faculty of Medicine of that city until 1944.

On October 6, 1978, her daughter, Patricia Julia Roisinblit, who was eight months pregnant, was kidnapped with her (Patricia's) husband, José Manuel Pérez Rojo, by a task force of the Argentine Air Force. Both were members of the Montoneros. It is presumed that both were killed in the context of illegal repression that took place in Argentina during the military dictatorship self-styled National Reorganization Process. Her grandson, born in captivity on November 15 of that year, was given to Air Force civilian worker Francisco Gómez and his wife to raise as their own; he was found in 2000.

In September 2016 Omar Graffigna, Commander of the Air Force at the time of the kidnapping, and the Air Force's Buenos Aires Regional Intelligence (RIBA) head Luis Trillo were sentenced in Argentina to 25 years imprisonment for the abduction and torture of the couple. Gómez, who had been given Patricia's baby, was imprisoned for 12 years. Before sentencing Graffigna made no reference to the crimes, but said that he had behaved in an entirely professional way in the last six years of his career. She turned 100 in August 2019.

References

1919 births
Living people
Argentine centenarians
Argentine human rights activists
Women human rights activists
Argentine Jews
Grandmothers of the Plaza de Mayo
Illustrious Citizens of Buenos Aires
Jewish human rights activists
People from San Cristóbal Department
Women centenarians